Harold Douglas "Doc" Martin (April 14, 1899 – March 23, 1945) was an American football player and coach, and a Negro league baseball player. Martin served as the head football coach at Virginia Union University from 1921 to 1923, Shaw University from 1924 to 1926, and Virginia State University from 1927 to 1932, compiling a career a college football coaching record of 63–22–12.

Biography
Martin began his playing career in 1916 when he became the first African American cadet in the history of Norwich University in [[Northfield
, Vermont]].

Martin lettered in football, baseball, ice hockey, and track at Norwich. He later earned a master's degree at New York University and taught at Miner Teachers College—now known as the University of the District of Columbia. Martin was appointed the athletic director at Virginia Union University in 1921. He moved to Shaw University in 1924 as athletic director.

Martin was called into active military duty in 1942, serving as a major in the United States Army. He was killed in an aircraft crash, on March 23, 1945, near Reidsville, North Carolina. Martin is buried at Arlington National Cemetery in Arlington, Virginia.

Head coaching record

Football

References

External links
Baseball statistics and player information from Baseball-Reference Black Baseball Stats and Seamheads

1899 births
1945 deaths
Accidental deaths in North Carolina
Baseball third basemen
Norwich Cadets baseball players
Norwich Cadets football players
Norwich Cadets men's ice hockey players
Pittsburgh Keystones players
Shaw Bears athletic directors
Shaw Bears football coaches
Shaw Bears men's basketball coaches
Virginia State Trojans football coaches
Virginia Union Panthers athletic directors
Virginia Union Panthers baseball coaches
Virginia Union Panthers football coaches
College men's track and field athletes in the United States
College tennis coaches in the United States
University of the District of Columbia faculty
New York University alumni
United States Army personnel killed in World War II
United States Army officers
Coaches of American football from Massachusetts
Players of American football from Boston
Baseball players from Boston
Basketball coaches from Massachusetts
Ice hockey coaches from Massachusetts
Track and field athletes from Boston
African-American coaches of American football
African-American players of American football
African-American baseball players
African-American basketball coaches
African-American college athletic directors in the United States
African-American ice hockey players
African-American male track and field athletes
Burials at Arlington National Cemetery
20th-century African-American sportspeople
African Americans in World War II
African-American United States Army personnel
Victims of aviation accidents or incidents in 1945
Victims of aviation accidents or incidents in the United States